William Warren Rose (April 11, 1904 – October 6, 1987) was a Canadian curler. He was the skip of the 1946 Brier Champion team representing Alberta. Rose was born in Sedgewick, Alberta and was inducted into the Alberta Sports Hall of Fame and Museum in 1980.

References

1904 births
1987 deaths
Alberta Sports Hall of Fame inductees
American emigrants to Canada
Brier champions
Canadian male curlers
Curlers from Alberta
People from Flagstaff County
Sportspeople from Minot, North Dakota